The term Crab Bowl may refer to either:
Crab Bowl Classic, the college football rivalry game between the University of Maryland and the United States Naval Academy
Maryland Crab Bowl, an annual high school football all-star game